Shurabad (also Romanized as Shūrābād) is a village in Satar Rural District, Kolyai District, Sonqor County, Kermanshah Province, Iran. At the 2006 census, its population was 608, in 158 families.

References 

Populated places in Sonqor County